Ruslan Fatihūly Jaqsylyqov (: born 4 March 1966) is a Kazakh Colonel general serving as the Minister of Defence since 19 January 2022.

Biography

Early life and education 
Jaqsylyqov was born in the city of Kaskelen in Almaty Region. From 1983, he attended the Alma-Ata Higher Combined Arms Command School where Jaqsylyqov was taught tactical commanding before graduating in 1987. From the mid 1990's, Jaqsylyqov resided in Russia where he attended the Frunze Military Academy and earned specialty in "Command-staff operational-tactical military intelligence" in 1996 and then the Military Academy of the General Staff of the Armed Forces of Russia where Jaqsylqov learned "Military security of the state" specialty in 2004.

Career 
In September 2003, Jaqsylyqov was elected as member of the Shymkent City Mäslihat where he worked for short time until February 2004, when he became the brigade commander of the internal troops under the Ministry of Internal Affairs.

From 2006, Jaqsylyqov served as a deputy commander of internal troops before being promoted as first deputy commander and chief of the main staff in 2007. On 4 September 2008, he was appointed as a full commander and served the post until 22 January 2013, when he became the commander-in-chief. From 24 April 2014, Jaqsylyqov headed the National Guard as a commander-in-chief.

In an August 2019 report published by Time.kz, Jaqsylyqov while serving as lieutenant-general was accused of extorting money from the V.S. GOLD COMPANY LLP., a contract company which provided meals to the regional Kazakh National Guard personnel, resulting in funds being slashed that would have otherwise covered the costs for meals with the unit servicemen being left more malnourished while Jaqsylyqov among other high-ranking officers according to the report, were living a luxurious lifestyle by staying at five star hotels and ordering coffee, soft drinks and ice cream at VIP-terminals at the expense of the company's money.

On 29 September 2021, while commanding the National Guard, Jaqsylyqov became Deputy Minister of Internal Affairs. Following the 2022 Kazakh unrest, he was appointed as the Defence Minister on 19 January 2022 by President Kassym-Jomart Tokayev, replacing Murat Bektanov who was shortly arrested due to his handling failure in the unrest. During visit to the garrison in Almaty on 11 February 2022, Jaqsylyqov awarded servicemen who were injured in the riots, noting that all military personnel will continue serving in the Armed Forces.

Reference

External links 

 Personal reference (in Russian)

Living people
1966 births
Kazakhstani military personnel
Government ministers of Kazakhstan
Ministers of Defence of Kazakhstan
21st-century Kazakhstani politicians
People from Almaty Region